Beotegi is a village in the municipality of Ayala/Aiara, in Álava province, Basque Country, Spain. 

Populated places in Álava